The Puerto Rican coastal blind snake (Antillotyphlops hypomethes) is a species of snake in the Typhlopidae family.

References

Antillotyphlops
Reptiles described in 1991